Pentrefelin is the name of several places in Wales:

 Pentrefelin, Anglesey
 Pentrefelin, Carmarthenshire
 Pentrefelin, Ceredigion
 Pentrefelin, Conwy
 Pentrefelin, Denbighshire
 Pentrefelin, Gwynedd
 Pentrefelin, Powys, two miles south-east of Llanrhaeadr-ym-Mochnant, location of the now closed Pentrefelin railway station